The Nyland Brigade, officially Nylands Brigad (NylBr) in Swedish,  (UudPr), is a brigade-level marine-type unit of the Finnish Navy stationed in Dragsvik in Raseborg in the province of Uusimaa. The Brigade trains Coastal Jaegers and other troops for combat in coastal environments. It is the only unit of the Finnish Defence Forces where the instruction language is Swedish, the country's other official language. The command language is, however, Finnish.

The brigade also trains personnel for the International ATU unit (Amphibious Task Unit), which is a special crisis management force that can be employed in coastal environments.

Organization
 Headquarters
 Vasa Coastal Jaeger Battalion
1st Coastal Jaeger Company
2nd Coastal Jaeger Company
NCO School
 Ekenäs Coastal Battalion
Mortar Company
Headquarters and Signals Company
Combat Engineer Company
 Supply Center

The Vasa Coastal Jaeger Battalion trains Coastal Jaegers, boatsmen, coastal missile troops, reconnaissance troops and ATU platoons. The Ekenäs Coastal Battalion trains mortar and signal troops, military policemen, chauffeurs, supply specialists and combat engineers.

History

The brigade follows the traditions of the Nyland and Tavastehus Cavalry Regiment, which Gustavus Adolphus established in 1626. The regiment distinguished itself in the Battle of Siikajoki during the Finnish War. The brigade also traces back its history to the 3rd Jaeger Regiment during the Finnish Civil War, renamed Uusimaa Regiment during the interwar period. After the Winter War, the Uusimaa Regiment was one of the units forming the new 13th Brigade, which formed the basis of the 13th Infantry Regiment (JR13) during the Continuation War, later called the 4th Infantry Regiment, which was restructured to form the 4th Brigade and renamed to Nyland Brigade in 1957. The unit became a part of the Finnish Navy in 1998, having been an Army unit until then.

Equipment
The brigade utilizes XA-185 Pasi APCs and trucks for land transport, and Jehu, Jurmo, Uisko and G class landing craft for amphibious transport. The motorized artillery previously used 130 K 54 guns, but now relies on Spike-ER missiles for anti-ship warfare.

Publications

 Fanbäraren, magazine, 1935-

External links
Official Nyland Brigade Webpage in English
Recruitment video

Naval units and formations of Finland
Organisations based in Raseborg
Brigades of Finland
Military units and formations established in 1957